Smolensky (masculine), Smolenskaya (feminine), or Smolenskoye (neuter) is the name of several rural localities in Russia:
Smolensky, Altai Krai, a settlement in Khleborobny Selsoviet of Bystroistoksky District of Altai Krai
Smolensky, Republic of Mordovia, a settlement in Salovsky Selsoviet of Lyambirsky District of the Republic of Mordovia
Smolensky, Novosibirsk Oblast, a settlement in Moshkovsky District of Novosibirsk Oblast
Smolensky, Orenburg Oblast, a settlement in Gostepriimny Selsoviet of Svetlinsky District of Orenburg Oblast
Smolensky, Tula Oblast, a settlement in Arkhangelsky Rural Okrug of Kamensky District of Tula Oblast
Smolenskoye, Altai Krai, a selo in Smolensky Selsoviet of Smolensky District of Altai Krai
Smolenskoye, Oryol Oblast, a village in Starogolsky Selsoviet of Novoderevenkovsky District of Oryol Oblast
Smolenskoye, Yaroslavl Oblast, a selo in Smolensky Rural Okrug of Pereslavsky District of Yaroslavl Oblast
Smolenskaya (rural locality), a stanitsa in Smolensky Rural Okrug of Seversky District of Krasnodar Krai